Muhamma is a census town in Cherthala Taluk in Alappuzha district in the Indian state of Kerala. It is home to Cheerappanchira kalari, where Lord Ayyappa of Sabarimala had his training in the martial arts. Cheerappanchira is an Ezhava ancestral home in Muhamma. Muhamma was the village where the Communist Party of India (Marxist) leader P. Krishna Pillai died after sustaining a snake-bite. Pathiramanal island, one of the scenic spots in vembanad lake is a part of Muhamma Panchyath.Muhamma boat jetty offers ferry services to Kumarakom and Alappuzha. Pathiramnal island can be accessed by private owned boats and also by government operated water transport.

Demographics
 India census, Muhamma had a population of 24,518. Males constitute 48% of the population and females 52%. Muhamma has an average literacy rate of 85%, higher than the national average of 59.5%: male literacy is 88%, and female literacy is 83%. In Muhamma, 10% of the population is under 6 years of age.

Geography

Muhamma is a small village in Alappuzha. Pathiramanal is a small island and tourist attraction in Muhamma. Kanjikkuzhi (S.L.Puram), Mannanchery and Thanneermukkom are neighbouring villages of Muhamma. The east side of the Muhamma is the Vembanad backwater, which borders Kottayam district. The other side of the backwater is Kumarakam. Muhamma-Kumarakam is the widest part of the Vembanad backwater. A distance of about 8 km can be travelled by boat (state water service is available) in 40 minutes.

Transport
Government ferry is available to Kumarakom, Cheepunkal and Maniaparampu

References

External links
Muhamma.com Authentic website about Muhamma

Cities and towns in Alappuzha district